Hubert Schleichert (born July 30, 1935 in Vienna - September 13, 2020 in Munich) was an Austrian emeritus philosopher (from Vienna), now living in Konstanz.

His works have emphasized political philosophy, theory of argument and non-European philosophy, especially Chinese philosophy.

Working with Urs Egli, Schleichert contributed to erotetics (theory of questions) by assembling an annotated bibliography of works in philosophy, linguistics, automatic answering, and psychology/pedagogy.

Bibliography 
 Die erkenntnislogischen Grundlagen der klassischen Physik (1963, with Bela Juhos) 
 Elemente der physikalischen Semantik (1966)
 Klassische Chinesische Philosophie. Eine Einführung (1990) 
 Der Begriff des Bewußsteins. Eine Bedeutungsanalyse (1992) 
 Wie man mit Fundamentalisten diskutiert, ohne den Verstand zu verlieren (1997) 
 Logik und Denken (1998) 
 Von Platon bis Wittgenstein. Ein philosophisches Lesebuch (1998)  
 Fritz Mauthner. Das Werk eines kritischen Denkers (1999, with Elisabeth Leinfellner)

References

 Hubert Schleichert at PhilPapers

20th-century Austrian philosophers
1935 births
Living people